Pigmentiphaga is a genus of motile and nonmotile bacteria of the family  Alcaligenaceae.

References

Burkholderiales
Bacteria genera